Karl Kern (May 18, 1900 – October 14, 1974) was a German politician of the Christian Democratic Union (CDU) and former member of the German Bundestag.

Life 
Kern joined the CDU in 1949, and by 1948 he had already returned to the Kirchhausen municipal council. From 1948 he also sat in the Heilbronn district council. In the first legislative period from 1949 to 1953 he was a member of the German Bundestag. In Parliament he was a full member of the Committee on Transport and the Committee on Postal and Telecommunications Affair

Literature

References

1900 births
1974 deaths
Members of the Bundestag for Baden-Württemberg
Members of the Bundestag 1949–1953
Members of the Bundestag for the Christian Democratic Union of Germany